Montgomery County High School may refer to several high schools in the United States:
Montgomery County High School (Alabama) in Montgomery, Alabama
Montgomery County High School (Georgia) in Mount Vernon, Georgia
Montgomery County High School (Kentucky) in Mount Sterling, Kentucky
Montgomery County High School (Mississippi) in Kilmichael, Mississippi
Montgomery County High School (Missouri) in Montgomery City, Missouri

See also
 Montgomery County Public Schools (Maryland), Montgomery County, Maryland
 Montgomery County Public Schools (Virginia), Montgomery County, Virginia